This article lists the members of the 38th Parliament of Canada and how they voted on Bill C-38, now known as the Civil Marriage Act. Bill C-38 amended the Marriage Act of Canada to recognize same-sex marriage (SSM). The 38th Parliament began with the federal election of June 28, 2004, and was dissolved on November 29, 2005. It was dissolved prior to the election of January 23, 2006. The legislation was later challenged by the members of the 39th Canadian Parliament.

Votes
House of Commons

This tally does not include the Speaker, who only votes in the House if there is a tie.

Up to 154 votes were needed to ensure the legislation passes, although the only formal requirement for passing legislation is the assent of a majority of members in attendance for the vote.

Senate

For the purposes of this table, the Speaker of the Senate, who did not vote, is counted as an absentee since the official Senate tabulation does not list him as an abstainer.

Background
It was expected that if enough of the members that favour same-sex marriage show up, Bill C-38 would indeed pass. The Globe and Mail'''s analysis on December 13, 2004 placed the upper limit of opposed votes at 142.

The intended voting positions of senators are less clear. Some observers argue that, even if a majority of senators is opposed, it is unlikely that they would vote as such, and most would instead skip the vote rather than stop a bill passed by the House. This argument has weight as this has traditionally been the case on most issues. The last time the Senate faced such a "moral" issue, however, was in 1989 when the Senate defeated a bill that would have restricted late term abortion and removed broader anti-abortion language from the Criminal Code that had been struck down by the Supreme Court of Canada.

Most of the Liberal cabinet, the Bloc Québécois (BQ) and the New Democratic Party (NDP) voted in favour of the Bill, while most of the Conservative Party members were against it. In the Liberal backbench, about 2/3 of members voted in favour.

On April 12, 2005, a vote was held on an amendment to Bill C-38 proposed by the Leader of the Opposition, Stephen Harper. The amendment would have stopped C-38 from advancing and maintained the "traditional" definition of marriage. The proposed amendment was defeated by a vote of 164 to 132. Ten MPs were absent, including 5 BQ MPs who reportedly oppose the bill. Certain MPs who had previously not declared their positions on the issue revealed their stands on the bill in this vote. All of these voted against the amendment, and therefore can be assumed to be in favour of same-sex marriage. Liberal MP Joe Comuzzi, who months prior to the vote mused about resigning his post as Minister of State, voted against the amendment because "it was a Conservative motion".

A vote-in-principle was expected around April 19, but Conservatives stalled the bill by bringing up more MPs to speak on the issue. The 2nd reading vote came up on a recorded division, and passed 164–137. The rise in votes for the opposition came from several Bloc MPs who were absent for Harper's amendment, but present for the 2nd reading vote.

Bill C-38 entered Report Stage on June 16, 2005. After exiting committee, the Government agreed to amendments to the bill that will further protect religious officials who do not wish to perform same-sex marriages, and to protect charitable organizations from losing their tax status.

While the Government wanted to pass C-38, its main priority was to first pass C-48 (the NDP additions to the budget), which the Bloc and the Conservatives opposed. The third reading vote on that bill in the House was expected the final week of June, after the House adopted a motion (supported by the Liberals, Bloc Québécois'', and NDP) to extend the sitting of the house. Bill C-48 passed just before midnight on June 23, 2005 when the Liberals agreed with the Bloc and NDP to force a snap vote on the bill. The snap vote on C-48 was significant because if all Conservative MPs were present for the vote, and if all Bloc opposed, and the Independents voted as they usually did, the Government would have been defeated.

House of Commons

Liberal Cabinet
As per the principle of cabinet solidarity, all cabinet ministers were expected to vote in favour of government-introduced legislation. While backbench MPs in 2003, six future cabinet ministers voted in favour of a Canadian Alliance motion defining marriage in exclusively traditional terms. Joe Comuzzi decided to leave cabinet in order to vote against SSM. John Efford, a cabinet minister who recently opposed SSM decided to vote in favour of C-38. Former Liberal MP Pat O'Brien said he was personally told by six ministers that they may leave the cabinet rather than support SSM legislation, but this did not happen. Stephen Harper has pressured Paul Martin to allow his cabinet members a free vote, citing the precedent of Brian Mulroney in a capital punishment vote in 1988.

Liberal backbench
At the Liberal biennial convention in March, delegates overwhelmingly approved same-sex marriage as a matter of party policy. Paul Martin allowed his caucus a free vote.

Conservatives
At the Conservative convention, delegates overwhelmingly approved the definition of marriage as only being between one man and one woman as a matter of party policy with 74% in favour, and 26% opposed. Stephen Harper allowed his caucus a free vote.

Bloc Québécois
The BQ had a free vote.

New Democratic Party
The NDP caucus did not allow a free vote so MPs were obliged to vote in favour by the party whip.

Independents

Speaker
The Speaker of the House of Commons votes only in the event of a tie. Milliken is a Liberal.

Marriage support by seat

Senate

See Senators of the 38th Canadian Parliament and same-sex marriage

See also

Same-sex marriage in Canada
Gay rights in Canada

External links
www.howdtheyvote.ca — has the complete voting history of the 38th Parliament, including Bill C-38.

Same-sex marriage in Canada
Canadian federal legislation